Walhachin is a small ghost town in the Thompson Country region of British Columbia, Canada. It is located  about 10 km west of Kamloops Lake, and is 65 km west of Kamloops on the south shore of the Thompson River near Highway 1. The population is 31 (2018) and the postal code is V0K 2P0.

In its heyday, from 1909 until 1914, this historic town was an affluent colony of English settlers and was often termed "Canada's Camelot".

History

Walhachin was first named "Pennie's", after the original settler, Charles Pennie.
But the true saga of Walhachin would begin in 1907 when Charles Barnes, an American entrepreneur, was working as a land surveyor at Ashcroft and visited Pennie's ranch and admired his    orchard. Despite the fact that Walhachin lies in the center of British Columbia's dry belt and has an average annual rainfall of less than 20 cm, Barnes envisioned thousands of acres of lush orchards and an elegant community of gentlemen farmers, primarily members of the English upper-class and aristocracy. For financial backing of this grand vision he contacted a company in England, the British Columbia Development Association, who had already invested in several British Columbia properties including the ranch at 111 Mile House on the Cariboo Road. Barnes invited Sir William Bass, and an agriculturist and an engineer to come view the property. The men endorsed Barnes' plan and reported back to the BCDA that the land was a good investment and on January 21, 1908, they purchased the Pennie Ranch and an additional  parcel for $200 an acre for a total of $229,400. The BCDA then created two subsidiary companies, the British Columbia Horticultural Estates Limited to market the  plots of farmland, and the Dry Belt Settlement Utilities Limited to market lots on the  townsite. Charles Barnes became the manager of BC Horticultural Estates Ltd and purchased an additional  from the Dominion Government for a dollar an acre.

In 1909 the town was named Walhachin (which means "Land of the Round Rock" in the Nlaka'pamux (Thompson) language). However, when a thirty page pamphlet was printed in England, the name Walhachin was interpreted to mean "Bountiful Valley".

The advertising campaign was successful and most of the people who purchased the land were so convinced by the pamphlet's glowing reports that they bought the property sight unseen. An addition incentive was given to the new settlers when the Canadian government allowed them to bring in their personal effects without paying a duty. This was a major consideration to many of the newcomers, who would only consider moving to the Canadian wilderness if they could bring all the lavish comforts of home with them. Soon Barnes' vision of the elegant orchard community had been realized and all of the new land owners were titled or upper-class Englishmen.

Walhachin was no ordinary pioneer community, but boasted luxurious amenities that were nearly unheard of in other towns of the era. The Walhachin Hotel had an elegantly appointed dining room, three rotundas and offered quality accommodations. It also had a strictly enforced dress code.
Many of the townspeople lived in fine stone homes with high ceilings and large fireplaces and had servants, maids and valets. In town, there was a Chinese laundry, a polo field, a swimming pool, a skating rink and tennis courts.

The biggest problem that the new settlers at Walhachin faced was irrigating the orchards, as most of the properties had no water supply. To solve the problem, the residents decided to build a flume that would carry water down the mountainside to irrigation ditches. By April 1910, they had built  of flume and ditches on the north bank of the Thompson River, but due to improper construction of the flume and shaky trestles, it couldn't carry as much water as was needed to irrigate the orchards during excessively dry periods. Nevertheless, the community persevered and by 1914, there were 300 residents.

Despite the hardships and trials that these newcomers faced, it was not through their weakness or lack of knowledge that the dream of Walhachin failed, but the onset of the Great War which caused many of the British residents to return home to fight for their country. Most would never return and by 1922 the last resident of Walhachin had left.

Recent activity is the quarrying of rock, close above the townsite, for railbed ballast.  Residents are occasionally bombarded by flying stone debris from the blasting operations.   This quarry can be seen from Highway 1 as a black scar on the hillside above the town.   As this area is cattle ranching country, much of the arable, flat land is planted to alfalfa for winter hay.   The hot, dry climate, and irrigation water from the river, enable two or three crops each summer.

See also
 List of ghost towns in British Columbia
 Walhachin Oxbows Provincial Park

Notes

Further reading
 Walhachin:Catastrophe or Camelot? Joan Weir 
 Ghost Towns of British Columbia Bruce Ramsey Mitchell Press, Vancouver, 1963, OCLC: 39371 ISBN Unknown

External links
Information on Walhachin

Ghost towns in British Columbia
Thompson Country
Populated places in the Thompson-Nicola Regional District